John Godfrey Huggins, 2nd Viscount Malvern of Rhodesia and of Bexley (26 October 1922 – 28 August 1978) was a British peer and officer in the Royal Air Force during the Second World War. He was a member of the House of Lords from 1971 until his death in 1978.

Early life and education 
Huggins was the son of Godfrey Huggins, an English doctor working in Southern Rhodesia, later prime minister of Southern Rhodesia and first Viscount Malvern, and his wife Blanche Elizabeth Slatter. He arrived in England on 23 September  1938 on the RMS Windsor Castle, from Durban, South Africa, and was educated at Winchester College.

Career 
In 1940, Huggins joined the Royal Air Force and was promoted to Flight Lieutenant in 1944. He retired in 1945, but re-joined the Air Force in 1952. He inherited his father's peerage on 8 May 1971.

Personal life
On 1 January 1949, Huggins married Patricia Marjorie Bower, a daughter of Frank Renwick Bower. They had three children: Michael Paul John (born 1946); Ashley Kevin Godfrey Huggins, 3rd Viscount Malvern (born 1949); 
and Haoli Elizabeth Jane (born 1953).

References 

1922 births
1978 deaths
People educated at Winchester College
Royal Air Force officers
Viscounts in the Peerage of the United Kingdom